E2F-associated phosphoprotein is a protein that in humans is encoded by the EAPP gene.

This gene encodes a phosphoprotein that interacts with several members of the E2F family of proteins. The protein localizes to the nucleus, and is present throughout the cell cycle except during mitosis. It functions to modulate E2F-regulated transcription and stimulate proliferation.

References

Further reading